Quarles is a surname, and may refer to:

 Benjamin Arthur Quarles (1904–1996), historian, administrator, scholar, educator
 Christina Quarles (born 1985), artist
 Donald A. Quarles (1894–1959), communications engineer, level executive
 Francis Quarles (1592–1644), poet
 Greenfield Quarles (1847–1921), soldier, judge
 James Minor Quarles (1823–1901), American politician
 John Quarles (1624–1665), poet
 Joseph V. Quarles (1843–1911), American politician
 Julian Minor Quarles (1848–1929), U.S. Democratic politician
 Nancy L. Quarles (born 1951), American politician
 Randal Quarles (born 1957), managing director
 Shelton Quarles (born 1971), sportsman
 Tunstal Quarles (1781—1856)
 William Andrew Quarles (1825–1893), Tennessee lawyer, politician, railroad executive
 William D. Quarles Jr. (born 1948), United States District Judge
 William Quarles (cricketer) (1800–1879), English cricketer 

 Quarles, Quarles de Quarles or Quarles van Ufford, a Dutch noble family of English descent.
Quarles was a pseudonym used by Edgar Allan Poe for 'The Raven'.

Quarles is a place, and may refer to:
 Quarles, Norfolk, England
 Quarles, Missouri, a community in the United States
 Quarles Range, A mountain range in Antarctica

See also 
Quarles & Brady LLP, U.S. law firm
New York v. Quarles, a 1984 U.S. Supreme Court case